Rivière-du-Loup may refer to:
 Rivière-du-Loup, a city in Quebec
 Rivière du Loup, a river in Quebec
 Rivière-du-Loup Regional County Municipality
 Rivière-du-Loup (electoral district), a provincial electoral district in Quebec
 Rivière-du-Loup–Témiscouata, a provincial electoral district in Quebec
 Kamouraska–Rivière-du-Loup, a former provincial electoral district in Quebec
 HMCS Riviere du Loup (K357), a Canadian warship
 Rivière-du-Loup station, a railway station